Powelliphanta annectens is one of the amber snails, an air-breathing  land snail, a terrestrial gastropod mollusc in the family Rhytididae.  It is a protected species with very limited distribution.

Distribution 
This species occurs in the northern parts of the South Island of New Zealand.  The only individuals have been found between 2,000 and 2,500 ft from the Oparara River near Karamea, to Gunner Downs south of the Heaphy River.

Life cycle 

The shape of the eggs of this species is oval. They are seldom constant in dimensions, varying from 9 × 8 mm to 9 × 8.5 mm.

References

Powelliphanta
Gastropods described in 1936
Taxa named by Arthur William Baden Powell
Endemic fauna of New Zealand
Endemic molluscs of New Zealand